Veratramine is an alkaloid isolated from the rhizomes of Veratrum.

References 

Piperidine alkaloids